This is an incomplete list of artists who have produced works on Orientalist subjects, drawn from the Islamic world or other parts of Asia.  Many artists listed on this page worked in many genres, and Orientalist subjects may not have formed a major part of their body of work. For example, the list includes some portrait painters based in Europe who on occasion painted sitters wearing "oriental" costume.  The list also includes Orientalist photographers, engravers and lithographers.  The list includes links to the English Wikipedia, and where no English article exists, named artists are linked to foreign language versions of Wikipedia, where available.

Note: This listing uses Spanish naming customs, for personalities from cultural areas where they prevail : the first family name is the paternal name and the second is the maternal family name. Artists are listed alphabetically by their paternal family name. For example, the Spanish artist, Joaquín Sorolla y Bastida, is listed under "S" for Sorolla, the paternal family name.

A

 Luigi Acquarone (Italian, 1800–1896) 
  (French, 1899–1950)  
 Edouard Joseph Alexander Agneessens (Belgian, 1842–1885) 
 Simon Agopyan  (also known as Simon Hagopian) (Armenian, 1857–1921)
 Christoph Ludwig Agricola (German, 1667–1719)
Ivan Konstantinovich Aivazovsky (Russia, 1817–1900)
 Tadeusz Ajdukiewicz (Polish, 1852–1916)
 José Alcázar Tejedor (Spanish, 1850–1907)
 George Aleef (Russian, 1887–1970) 
 William Allan (Scottish, 1782–1850) 
 Gaudensi Allar (French, 1841–1904) architect and sculptor
  (French, 1899–1974)
 Francesco Saverio Altamura (Italian, 1822–1897) 
 Germán Álvarez Algeciras (Spanish, 1848–c.1912)
 Eugenio Álvarez Dumont (Spanish, 1864–1927)  
 Rodolfo Amoedo (Brazilian, 1857–1941)
  (Austrian, 1855–1895)
 Federico Amérigo y Rouvier  (Cuban-Spanish, 1840–1912)
 Pierre Andrieu (French, 1821–1892) 
 Luis Anglada Pinto (Spanish, 1873–1946) 
 Louis Ferdinand Antoni (French, 1872–1940)
 German Aracil (Spanish, b. 1965)
 Charles Édouard Armand-Dumaresq (French, 1826–1895) 
 Hippolyte Arnoux (French, fl.1860–1890) photographer, active in the Nile Valley
 José Arpa y Perea (Spanish, 1858–1952)
  (Spanish, 1829–1891) 
 Josep Arrau i Barba (Spanish, 1802–1872) 
 Ressam Kamil Aslanger (Turkish, b. 1949)
  (French, 1892–1977)  
 Albert Louis Aublet (French, 1851–1938)    
 Émile Aubry (French, 1880–1964) 
 Giuseppe Aureli (Italian, 1858–1929) 
 Adolphe Aze (French, 1823–1884)

B

 Henry Bacon (American, 1839–1912)
  (Italian, 1860–1923)
 Léon Bakst (Russian, 1866–1924)
 Mariano Baquero (Spanish, 1838–c.1890)
 Ricardo Balaca y Orejas-Canseco (Spanish, 1844–1880) 
 Mathieu Barathier (French, 1784–1867) lithographer and engraver
 Filippo Baratti (Italian, 1849–1936)
 Jean Barbault (French, 1718–1762)
 Charles Bargue (French, c. 1826/1827–1883)
 Josep Tapiró Baró (Spanish, 1836–1913)
 François Pierre Barry (French, 1813–1905) 
 Mariano Barbasán y Lagueruela (Spanish, 1864–1924) 
 Prosper Barbot (French, 1798–1877)
 Salvador Sánchez Barbudo (Spanish, 1857–1917)  
 Alfonso Barrada y Medina (Spanish, 1857–1905)
 Federico Bartolini (Italian 1861–1908)
 Marius Bauer (Dutch, 1867–1932)
 Gustav Bauernfeind (German, 1848–1904) 
 Frédéric Bazille (French, 1841–1870)
 Antonio Beato (Italian, 1835–1906) Orientalist photographer
 Felice Beato (Italian, 1832–1909) Orientalist photographer
 Émile Béchard (French, fl. 1870–1890) Orientalist photographer
 Mikhail Belaevsky (Russian, 1893–1930)
 Gentile Bellini (Italian, c.1429–1507)
 Pietro Bello (Italian, 1831–1909)
 Léon Belly (French, 1827–1877) 
 Manuel Benedito (Spanish, 1875–1963) 
 José Benlliure y Gil (Spanish, 1855–1937)
 Jean-Joseph Benjamin-Constant (French, 1845–1902)
 François-Léon Benouville (French, 1821–1859) 
 Joseph Austin Benwell (British, 1816–1886)
 Narcisse Berchère (French, 1819–1891)
 Émile Bernard (French, 1868–1941)
 Louis Michel Bernard (French, 1885–1962)
  (Spanish, 1842–1955) 
 Hippolyte Berteaux (French, 1843–1928)
 Antonio Berti (Italian, 1830–1912)
  (French, 1838–1902)
  (French, 1913–1994) painter, engraver and lithographer
 Alexandre Bida (French, 1813–1895)  
 Anton "Tony" Binder (Austrian, 1868–1944) painter and photographer 
 Gonzalo Bilbao (Spanish, 1860–1938)
 Cesare Biseo (Italian, 1843–1909)
  (French, 1891–1965)
 Norbert Bitner (Austrian, 1786–1845)
 Edwin Howland Blashfield (American, 1848–1936)
 Alexandre Bloch (French, 1857–1919)
 Ludwig Blum (Israeli, 1891–1975)
 Viktor Alexeevich Bobrov (Russian, 1842–1918)
 Barbara Bodichon (French, 1827–1891)  
 Pál Böhm (Hungarian, 1839–1905)
 Edmond Marie Félix de Boislecomte (French, 1849–1923)
 Maurice Boitel (French, 1919–2007)  
 Maurice Bompard (French, 1857–1936)
Félix Bonfils (French, 1831–1885) Orientalist photographer  
 Richard Parkes Bonington (British, 1802–1828)
 Léon Joseph Florentin Bonnat (French, 1833–1922)   
  (French, 1833–1901)
 Auguste Borget (French, 1808–1877) 
 Vladimir Borovikovsky (Russian, 1796–1825) 
 Carlo Bossoli (Italian, 1815–1884)
 Joseph-Félix Bouchor (French, 1853–1937) 
 Paul Louis Bouchard (French, 1853–1937) 
  (French, 1902–1965)
 François Boucher (French, 1703–1770)
 William-Adolphe Bouguereau (French, 1825–1905)
 Gustave Boulanger (French, 1824–1888)
 Lev Boure (Russian, 1877–1943)
 John Cooke Bourne (British, 1814–1896) Lithographer
 Bernard Boutet de Monvel (French, 1881–1949) 
  (French, 1893–1971)
 Eugen Bracht (Swiss, 1842–1921)
 Carlo Brancaccio (Italian, 1861–1920)
 Sir Frank William Brangwyn (Anglo-Welsh, 1867–1956) 
 Yves Brayer (French, 1907–1990) 
  (French, 1887–1971)
 Ferdinand Max Bredt (German, 1860–1921) 
  Germain Fabius Brest (French, 1823–1900)
 Anna Richards Brewster (American, 1870–1952)
 Frederick Arthur Bridgman (American, 1847–1928) 
 Édouard Brindeau de Jarny (French, 1867–1943)
 Florence Broadhurst (Australian, 1899–1977)
 Walery Brochocki (Polish, 1847–1923)
 André Brouillet (French, 1857–1914)
 George Elmer Browne (American, 1871–1946)
 Henriette Browne (French, 1829–1901)
 Karl Pavlovitch Briullov (Russian, 1799–1852)
  (French, 1891–1984)
 Frank Buchser (Swiss, 1828–1890)
 Francisco Bushell Laussat (Spanish, 1836–1901)
  (French, 1879–1958)

C

 Alexandre Cabanel (French, 1823–1889) 
 Umberto Cacciarelli (Italian, 1880–c.1939)
  (French, 1899–1985)
 Joaquin Capulino Jauregui (Spanish 1879–1969) 
 Miguel Navarro Cañizares (Spanish, 1840–1913) 
 Vittore Carpaccio (Italian, c.1465–1525/1526) 
 Léon Carré (French, 1878–1942)
 José María Casado del Alisal  (Spanish, 1830/32–1886)
 Francesco Giuseppe Casanova (Italian, 1727–1803)
 Manuel Castaño Guerrero (Spanish, 19th century) 
 Léon Cauvy (French, 1874–1933)
 Eugenio Cecconi (Italian, 1842–1903)
 Felice Cerruti Beauduc (Italian, 1818–1896)
 Giacomo Antonio Melchiorre Ceruti (Italian, 1698–1767) 
 James Wells Champney (American, 1843–1903)
 Eduard Charlemont (Austrian, 1848–1906)
 Théodore Chassériau (French, 1819–1856)
 Alfred Chateau (French, 1833–1908)
 Stanisław Chlebowski (Polish, 1835–1884)
 William Merritt Chase  (American, 1849–1916) 
 Ulpiano Checa (Spanish, 1860–1916) painter and sculptor
 Henri Chouanard (French, Oriental photographer 1883–1936)
 Frederic Edwin Church (American, 1826–1900) 
 Ettore Cercone (Italian, 1850–1896)
 Richard Clague (American, 1821–1873) 
 Georges Jules Victor Clairin (French, 1843–1919) 
 Félix Auguste Clément (French, 1826–1888)
 Leon Cogniet (French, 1794–1880)
 Francesco Coleman (Italian, 1851–1918) 
 John Maler Collier (British, 1850–1934)
 Samuel Colman (American, 1832–1920)
 Léon François Comerre (French, 1850–1916) 
 Colin Campbell Cooper (American, 1856–1937)
 Ricardo Villegas y Cordero (Spanish, 1849–1896)
 Charles Henri Joseph Cordier (French, 1827–1905)
 Lovis Corinth (German, 1858–1925) 
 Fernand Cormon (French, 1845–1924) 
 Michele Felice Cornè (French-American, 1752–1845) 
 George Corominas (Spanish, b. 1945)
 Jean-Baptiste Corot (French, 1796–1875)
 Hermann David Salomon Corrodi (Italian, 1844–1905)
 Michele Cortegiani (Italian, 1857–1928)
 Gustave Courbet (French, 1819–1877)
 Georges Croegaert (Belgian, 1848–1923)
 Andres Cuervo Herrero (Spanish, 1863–1933)

D

 Henri Dabadie (French, 1867–1949)
 Richard Dadd (English, 1817–1886)
 Thomas Daniell (English, 1749–1840)
 Massimo d'Azeglio (Italian, 1798–1866)
  (French, 1855–1937)
 Adrien Dauzats (French, 1804–1868) 
 Édouard Debat-Ponsan (French, 1847–1913) 
 Émile Deckers (Belgian, 1885–1968) 
 Alexandre-Gabriel Decamps (French, 1803–1860)
  (French, b. 1856)
 Charles-Émile-Callande de Champmartin (French, 1797–1883) 
 Alfred de Dreux (French, 1810–1860)
 Willem de Famars Testas (Dutch, 1834–1896)
 Antoine de Favray (French, 1706–1798) 
 Lockwood de Forest (American, 1850–1932) 
 Godefroy De Hagemann (French, 1820–1877)
 Alfred Dehodencq (French, 1822–1882)
 Gustave Léonard de Jonghe (Belgian, 1829–1893)
 Ferdinand Victor Eugène Delacroix (French, 1798–1863)
 Jean-Léon Gérôme Delacroix (French, 1824–1904)
  (French, 1867–1935)
 Nicolas de Largillierre (French, 1656–1746)
 Hippolyte Délié (French photographer in Egypt, fl. 1870–1890)
 Cesare Dell'Acqua (Italian, 1821–1905) 
 Marguerite Delorme (French, 1876–1946)
 Robert Leon Demachy (French, 1859–1936)  Orientalist photographer   
 Bernard Boutet de Monvel (French, 1881–1949)
 Henry d'Estienne (French, 1872–1949) 
 Julio Romero de Torres (Spanish, 1874–1930) 
 Ludwig Deutsch (Austrian, 1855–1935)
 Narcisse Virgilio Díaz (French, 1807–1876)
 Sir Francis Bernard Dicksee (British, 1853–1928) 
 Thomas Francis Dicksee (British, 1819–1895) 
 Joaquín Diez (Spanish, d.1882)
 Frank Dillon (British, 1823–1909)
 Alphonse Étienne Dinet (French, 1861–1929)  
 Sarkis Diranian (Armenian, 1854–1918)
 Jean Discart (French, 1855–1940)
 Francisco Domingo Marqués (Spanish, 1842–1920) . 
 Joaquín Domínguez Bécquer (Spanish, 1817–1879)
 Manuel Domínguez Sánchez (Spanish, 1840–1906)
 Charles D'Oyly (British, 1781–1845)
 Ferdinand Duboc (French, 1813–1869)
 François Dubois (French, 1790–1871)
 Paul Élie Dubois (French, 1886–1949) 
 Henriette Dubois-Damart, (French, 1885–1945)
 Édouard Louis Dubufe (French, 1819–1883)
 Maxime Du Camp  (French, 1822–1894) Orientalist photographer and writer  :fr:Maxime Du Camp
 Charles Dufresne (French, 1876–1938)
 Raoul Dufy (French, 1877–1953)
 Edmund Dulac (French, 1882–1953)
 Frank Vincent DuMond (American, 1865–1951) 
 Jean-Jules-Antoine Lecomte du Nouÿ (French, 1842–1923) 
 Jean Durand (French, 1894–1977) 
 Jean-Baptiste Henri Durand-Brager (French, 1814–1879) 
 Etienne Duval (French, 1824–1914)
 Frank Duveneck (American, 1848–1919)

E

  (French, 1892–1970)  
 Victor Eeckhout (Belgian, 1821–1879) 
 Ferencz Franz Eisenhut (Hungarian, 1857–1903) 
 Émile Eisman-Semenowsky (French, 1857–1911)  
 Tristram Ellis (English, 1844–1922)
 Rudolf Ernst (Austro-French, 1854–1932)
 José María Escacena y Daza (Spanish, 1800–1858) 
 Joaquin Espalter y Rull (Spanish, 1809–1880)
 Juan Espina y Capó (Spanish, 1848–1933) 
 Henry d'Estienne (French, 1872–1949)
 Lalla Essaydi (Moroccan, b. 1956) photographer and painter 
 Jose Etxenagusia (Spanish, 1844–1912)

F

 Fabio Fabbi (Italian 1861–1946)
 Antonio Maria Fabrés y Costa (Catalan: Antoni Maria Fabrés i Costa) (Spanish, 1854–1938)
 James Fairman (American, 1826–1904)
 Luis Ricardo Falero (Spanish, 1851–1896)  :es:Luis Ricardo Falero
 Harry Fenn (British-American, 1837–1911) 
 José María Fenollera (Spanish, 1851–1918) 
 Roger Fenton (British, 1819–1869) Orientalist photographer
  (French, 1880–1957) 
 Anselm Feuerbach (German, 1829–1880)
 Ludwig Hans Fischer (Austrian, 1848–1915) 
 Eugène Flandin (French, 1809–1889)
  (Italian, 1868–?)  
 Mariano Fortuny (Spanish, 1838–1874)
 Gaspare Fossati (Italian, 1809–1883)
 Plácido Francés y Pascual (Spanish, 1834–1902) 
  (Spanish, 1850–1897)
 Mary Jett Franklin (American, 1842-1926) 
  (French, 1848–1921) Orientalist photographer
 Pál Fried (Hungarian/American, 1893–1976)
 Francis Frith (English, 1822–1898) Orientalist photographer
 Eugène Fromentin (French, 1820–1876)
 Antonio Fuentes (Spanish, 1905–1995)

G

  (Italian, 1856–1926)
 William Gale (British, 1823–1909)
 José Gallegos y Arnosa (Spanish, 1857–1917) 
 Aisha Galimbaeva (Kazakhstani, 1917–2008) 
 Manuel García Hispaleto (Spanish, 1836–1898)
  (Spanish, 1853–1915)
 Vicente García de Paredes (Spanish, 1845–1903)
 José García Ramos (Spanish, 1852–1912)
 Manuel García y Rodríguez (Spanish, 1863–1925) 
 Antonio Gargiullo (Italian, 1897–1968)
 , (Orientalist photographer) (French, 1851–1901) 
 José Garrigues y Motos (Spanish, 1883–?)
 Rafael Garzón (French, Orientalist photographer) (1863–1923) 
 Georges Gasté (French, 1869–1910)  Orientalist photographer and painter
 Winckworth Allan Gay (American, 1821–1910) 
 Théodore Géricault  (French, 1791–1824) 
 Jean-Léon Gérôme (French, 1824–1904)
 Alejandrina Gessler y Lacroix, also known as "Madame Anselme" (Russian-Spanish, 1831–1907)
 Robert Swain Gifford (American, 1840–1905)
 Sanford Robinson Gifford (American, 1823–1880) 
 Paul-Albert Girard (French, 1839–1920) 
 Eugène Alexis Girardet (French, 1853–1907)
 Joseph-Philibert Girault de Prangey (French, 1804–1892), Orientalist photographer 
 Anne-Louis Girodet de Roussy-Trioson  (French, 1767–1824)
 John Gleich (German, 1879–c.1927)
 Marc Gabriel Charles Gleyre (Swiss, 1806–1874) 
  (Spanish, 1877–1938)
 Manuel Gómez-Moreno González (Spanish, 1834–1918) 
 Manuel González Méndez (Spanish, 1843–1909) 
 Edward Angelo Goodall (British, 1819–1908)
 Frederick Goodall (British, 1822–1904)
 Walter Gould (American, 1829–1893)
  (French, 1840–1884) Orientalist photographer & art collector See  also: Goupil & Cie
 Frédéric Goupil-Fesquet (French, 1817–1878) Orientalist photographer, active in Jerusalem on 11–14 December 1839
 Francisco Goya (Spanish, 1746–1828)
 Gustave Le Gray (French, 1820–1884) Orientalist photographer 
 Marco de Gregorio (Italian, 1829–1876)
 Antoine-Jean Gros (French, 1771–1835)
 John Griffiths (artist) (British, 1837–1918) 
  (Chinese, b. 1941)<!–– Do not move, Chinese name order ––>
 Gianantonio Guardi (Italian, 1699–1760) 
 Eugène Charles François Guérard (French, 1821–1866)
 Jules Guérin (artist) (American, 1866–1946) 
 Gustave Achille Guillaumet (French, 1840–1887)
 Pierre-Désiré Guillemet (French, 1827–1878)  
 Selma Gürbüz (Turkish, b. 1960)

H

 Carl Haag (Bavarian/British, 1820–1915)
 Carlos Sebastián Pedro Hubert de Haes (Spanish, 1829–1898) 
 Arthur Trevor Haddon (British, 1864–1941)
 George Henry Hall (artist) (American, 1825–1913) 
 Osman Hamdi Bey (Turkish, 1842–1910)
 Hans Hassenteufel (German, 1887–1943)
 Francesco Hayez (Italian, 1791–1882)
 René Charles Edmond His (French, 1877–1960)
 Theodor Hellwig (German, 1815–?)
 Léon Herbo (Belgian, 1850–1907) 
 José Cruz Herrera (Spanish, 1890–1972)
 William Holman Hunt (British, 1827–1910)
 Nathaniel Hone the Younger (Irish, 1831–1917)
 Marius Hubert-Robert (French, 1885–1966)
 Victor Huguet (French, 1835–1902) 
 Edmund Aubrey Hunt  (American, 1855–1922) 
 Jan-Baptist Huysmans (Belgian, 1826–1906)

I

 Francisco Nicolás Iturrino González (Spanish, 1864–1924) 
 Jean-Auguste Dominique Ingres (French, 1780–1867)
 Eugène Isabey (French, 1803–1886) 
 Daniel Israel (Austrian, 1859–1901)
  (Russian, 1889–1957)
 Francisco Iturrino (Spanish, 1864–1924)

J

 Jacob Jacobs (Belgian, 1812–1879)
 Paul Emil Jacobs (German, 1802–1866) 
 Alexandre Jacovleff (Russian, 1887–1938)
 José Jiménez Aranda (Spanish, 1837–1903)
 Juan Jiménez Martín (Spanish, 1858–1901)
 Augustus Edwin John (British, 1878–1961)
 Charles Ellis Johnson (American, 1857–1926) photographer
 Pierre-Gustave Joly de Lotbinière (Swiss-French, 1798–1865) Orientalist photographer.
 Hugh Bolton Jones (American, 1848–1927) 
 Gustave de Jonghe (Belgian, 1829–1893)
 Gustave-Henri Jossot (French, 1866–1951) 
Paja Jovanović (Serbian, 1859–1957) 
 Svetislav Jovanović (Serbian, 1861–1933)
 Francisco Jover y Casanova (Spanish, 1836–1890) 
 George William Joy (Irish, 1844–1925)

K

 Wassily Kandinsky (Russian, 1866 –1944) 
 Nikolay Karazin (Russian, 1842–1908) 
 Morteza Katouzian (Iranian, b. 1943)
 Adolf Kaufmann (Austrian, 1848–1916)
 Ivan Kazakov (Russian, 1883–1935) 
 Miner Kilbourne Kellogg (American, 1814–1889) 
 Robert Talbot Kelly (British, 1861–1943)
 Raphael Kirchner (Australian, 1876–1917)
 Paul Klee (Swiss-German, 1879–1940)
  (French, 1895–1968)
 Elena Nikandrovna Klokacheva (Russian, 1871–c.1943)
 Ernst Koerner (German, 1846–1927) 
 Oskar Kokoschka (Austrian, 1886–1980)
 Konstantin Korovin (Russian, 1861–1939)
 Franz Xaver Kosler (Austrian, 1864–1905)
 Setsuzo Kotsuji (Japanese, 1899–1973) 
 Johann Victor Krämer (Austrian, 1861–1949) Orientalist photographer and painter
 Ivan Kramskoi (Russian, 1837–1887) 
 Christian Krohg (Norwegian, 1852–1925) 
 Pavel Kuznetsov (Russian, 1878–1968)
 Gülsün Karamustafa (Turkish, b, 1946)

L

  (Spanish, 1835?–1883?)
 Francisco Lameyer Berenguer (Spanish, 1825–1877)
 Eugene Lanceray (Russian, 1875–1946)
 Augustus Osborne Lamplough (British, 1877–1930)
 Charles Landelle (French, 1821–1908) 
 Georges Landelle (French, 1860–1898) 
 Jean-Charles Langlois (French, 1789–1870) 
 Joseph de La Nézière (French, 1873–1944) 
 William Laparra (French, 1873–1920) 
 José de Larrocha González (Spanish, 1850–1933) 
 Jules Laurens (French, 1825–1901) 
 Sir John Lavery (Irish, 1856–1941)
 Jean-Raymond Hippolyte Lazerges (French, 1817–1887)
 Edward Lear (British, 1812–1888)
 Jean-Jacques-Francois Le Barbier (French, 1738–1826)
 Jules Lefebvre (French, 1834–1912) 
 Rudolf Franz Lehnert (Austro-Hungarian, 1878–1948)  Orientalist photographer
 Frederic Leighton (British, 1830–1896)
 Anton Robert Leinweber (German, 1845–1921)
 Charles-Amable Lenoir (French, 1860–1926) 
 Alexandre-Louis Leloir (French, 1843–1884) 
 Élisabeth Vigée Le Brun (French, 1755–1842)
 Paul Leroy (French, 1860–1942)
 John Frederick Lewis (British, 1805–1876)
 Karl Ludwig Libay (Slovak-Austrian, 1814/16–1888)
 Fernando Liger Hidalgo (Spanish, 1880–1945) 
 Antal Ligeti (Hungarian, 1823–1890) 
 Jean-Étienne Liotard (Swiss, 1702–1789)
 Juan Llimona Bruguera (Spanish, 1860–1926) 
 Louis-Anselme Longa (French, 1809–1869)
 Edwin Longsden Long (British, 1829–1891)
 Ernest Wadsworth Longfellow (American, 1845–1921)
  (Spanish, 1864–1950)
  (Spanish, 1883–1954)
 Vicente López Portaña (Spanish, 1722–1850)
 Pierre-Victorien Lottin (known as Victor Lottin de Laval) (French, 1810–1903)
 Eugenio Lucas Velázquez (Spanish, 1817–1870) 
 Juan Luna y Novicio (Filipino, 1857–1899)
 Egron Sellif Lundgren (Swedish, 1815–1875) 
 Fernand Lungren (American, 1857–1932)
 Alfredo Luxoro (Italian, 1859–1918)
 Nikiforos Lytras (Greek, 1832–1904)

M

 Carlile Henry Hayes Macartney (British, 1842–1924)
 Andrew MacCallum (English, 1821–1902) 
 Cesare Maccari (Italian, 1840–1919) 
 Georg Macco (German, 1863–1933)
 Auguste Macke (German, 1887–1914)
 Raimundo de Madrazo y Garreta (Spanish, 1841–1920) 
 Ricardo de Madrazo y Garreta (Spanish, 1852–1917)
 Albert Maignan (French, 1845–1908) 
 Hans Makart (Austrian, 1840–1884) 
 Konstantin Makovsky (Russian, 1839–1915)
 Jacques Majorelle (French, 1886–1962)
  (Algerian, 1886–1954)
 Vincent Manago (French, 1880–1936) 
 Gustavo Mancinelli (Italian, 1842–1906)
 Giacomo Mantegazza (Italian, 1853–1920)
 Georges Henri Manzana Pissarro (French, 1871–1961) 
 Vicente March (Spanish, 1859–1927) 
 Ludovico Marchetti (Italian, 1853–1909)
 D.S. Margoliouth (English, 1858–1940) 
 Pompeo Mariani (Italian, 1857–1927)
 Prosper Marilhat (French, 1811–1847)
 Vincenzo Marinelli (Italian, 1820–1892)
 Isidoro Marín Garés (Spanish, 1863–1926)
 Enrique Marín Sevilla (Spanish, 1876–1940)  
 Ramón Martí i Alsina (Spanish, 1826–1894) 
 Maria Martinetti (Italian, 1864–1921)
 Yvonne Mariotte (French, 1909–?)
  (French, 1847–1953)
  (Spanish, 1858–1919) 
 Serafín Martínez del Rincón y Trives (Spanish, 1840–1892)
 Arcadio Mas i Fondevila (Spanish, 1852–1934)
 Frank Henry Mason (British, 1876–1965)
 Francisco Masriera y Manovens (Spanish, 1842–1902)
 Henri Matisse (French, 1869–1954) 
 Virgilio Mattoni (Spanish, 1842–1923) 
 V. G. Maunier (French, fl.1850s) Orientalist photographer, active in Egypt.
 Auguste Maure (French, 1840–1907) Orientalist photographer
 Luigi Mayer (Italian, 1755–1803)
 Clara Barthold Mayer (Swiss?, ?–after 1803) 
  (Spanish, 1856–after 1905)
 Arthur Melville (British, 1858–1904)
 Willard Leroy Metcalf (American, 1858–1925) 
 Paul Friedrich Meyerheim (German, 1842–1915) 
 Alphons Leopold Mielich (Austrian, 1863–1929)
 Jules Migonney (French, 1876–1929)
  (French, 1921–2010)
 Natalya Milashevich (Russian, b. 1967)
 Eric Milet (French, 1870–1950) Orientalist photographer
 Addison Thomas Millar (American, 1850–1913)
 Francis Davis Millet (American, 1848–1912) 
 Camillo Miola (Italian, 1840–1919)
 Adolphe Joseph Thomas Monticelli (French, 1824–1886) 
 Harry Humphrey Moore (American, 1844–1926) 
 Gabriel Morcillo (Spanish, 1887–1973)
 Gustave Moreau (French, 1826–1898) 
  (Belgian, 1902–1992)
 Tomàs Moragas (Spanish, 1837–1906)
 Domenico Morelli (Italian, 1826–1901)
 José Moreno Carbonero (Spanish, 1860–1942) 
 Avedis Mouradian (Armenian, 1895–?)
 Harry Siddons Mowbray (American, 1858–1928) 
 Gerard Gustaaf Muller (Dutch, 1861–1929)
 William James Müller (British, 1812–1845)
 Leopold Carl Müller (Austrian, 1834–1892) 
 Domingo Muñoz (Spanish, 1850–1935)
 Antonio Muñoz Degrain (Spanish, 1840–1924) 
  (Spanish, 1860–1943) 
  (Spanish, 1850–1900)
 Takamitsu Muraoka (Japanese, b. 1938)

N

 José Navarro y Llorens (Spanish, 1867–1923)
  (French, 1846–1914) (Orientalist photographer)  
 Henry Roderick Newman (American, 1833–1918)
 Charles Wynne Nicholls (Irish, 1831–1903)
  (Spanish, fl.1868–1884)
  (Spanish, 1852–1898)
  (Spanish, 1855–1909)
 Aleksandr Nikolayev (Russian, 1897–1957)
 Josep Nin i Tudó (Spanish, 1843–1908)   
 Francesco Noletti, also known as Francesco Fieravino (Maltese, 1611–1654)
 Ernest Normand (British, 1857–1923)
 Elizabeth Nourse (American, 1859–1938)
 Édouard Auguste Nousveaux (French, 1811–1867) 
 Jean-Jules-Antoine Lecomte du Nouÿ (French, 1842–1923)

O

 Mariano Obiols Delgado (Spanish, c.1860–1911) 
 Frans Wilhelm Odelmark (Swedish, 1849–1937) 
 Aloysius O'Kelly (Irish, 1853–1941)
 Eugenio Oliva y Rodrigo (Spanish, 1852–1925) 
 Quintana Olleras (Spanish, 1851–1919)
 Karel Ooms (Belgian, 1845–1900)
 Georg Emanuel Opiz (German, 1775–1841) 
 François d'Orléans (French, 1818–1900)
 José Ortega (Spanish, 1877–1955)
 Antonio Ortiz Echagüe (Spanish, 1883–1942)
  (Spanish, 1943–1999)
 Pierre Outin (French, 1840–1899)

P

 Vicente Palmaroli González (Spanish, 1834–1896)
 Andrés Parladé (Spanish, 1859–1933)
 Walter Launt Palmer (American, 1854–1932)
 Frederic L. Pape (American, 1870–1938) 
 Paul Pascal (French, 1832–1903)
 Şeker Ahmed Pasha (Turkish, 1841–1907) 
 Alberto Pasini (Italian, 1826–1899)
 Paolino Pavesi-Bulbi (Italian, fl. late 19th century)
 Élie Anatole Pavil (French, 1873–1948)
 J Pavlikevitch (Russian?, 1893–1936)
 Eugène Pavy (French, 1840–1905) painter, brother of Philipe Pavy 
 Philippe Pavy (French, 1860–?) painter, brother of Eugène Pavy 
 Charles Sprague Pearce (American, 1851–1914)
 Josep Lluís Pellicer i Fenyé (Catalan, 1842–1901)
 Francisco Peralta del Campo (Spanish, 1837–1897) 
 Jenaro Pérez de Villaamil y d'Huguet (Spanish, 1807–1854) 
 Ella Ferris Pell (American, 1846–1922) 
 Josep Lluís Pellicer y Fenyé (Spanish, 1842–1901) 
 Frank (Francis) Crawford Penfold (American, 1849–1921)
 José Arpa y Perea (Spanish, 1858–1952)    
 Thomas Phillips (British, 1770–1845)
 Henry William Pickersgill (British, 1782–1875) 
 William Lamb Picknell (American, 1853–1897)
 Anton Pieck  (Dutch, 1895–1987)
 Harold H. Piffard (British, 1867–1939)
 Otto Pilny (Swiss, 1866–1936)
 Auguste-Émile Pinchart (French, 1842–1920) 
 Louis Émile Pinel de Grandchamp (French, 1831–1894)
 Niko Pirosmanishvili (Russian, 1862–1919)
 Casto Plasencia y Maestro (Spanish, 1846–1890) 
 Johann Georg Platzer (Austrian, 1704–1761) 
 Francisco Pradilla Ortiz (Spanish, 1848–1921) 
  (Russian, b.1961)
 Paul Poiret (French, 1879–1944)
 Vasily Polenov (Russian, 1844–1927)
 Henri Pontoy (French, 1888–1968)
 Gustav Pope (English, 1831–1910)
 Jean-François Portaels (Belgian, 1818–1895)
 Jan Portielje (Dutch, 1829–1908)
 Lucien Whiting Powell (American, 1846–1930) 
 Francisco Pradilla Ortiz (Spanish, 1848–1921) 
 Luigi Premazzi (Italian, 1814–1891)
 Amedeo Preziosi (Maltese, 1816–1882) 
 Val Prinsep (British, 1838–1904)
 Pavlos Prosalentis (Greek, 1784–1837)
  (Spanish, 1850–1905)

R

 Max Rabes (German, 1868–1944)
 Mohammed Racim (Algerian, 1896–1975) 
 Manuel Ramírez Ibáñez (Spanish, 1856–1925)
 Théodore Ralli (Greek, 1852–1909)
 Louis Randavel (French-Algerian, 1869–1947)
 Vittorio Rappini (Italian, 1877–1939)
  (French, 1791–1857)
 Grace Ravlin (American, 1873–1956)
 Roberto Raimondi (Italian, 1877–c.1957)
 Alexandre-Georges-Henri Regnault (French, 1843–1871)
 Frederic Sackrider Remington (American, 1861–1909)
 Ilya Repin (Russian, 1844–1930)
 Antonio María Reyna Manescau (Spanish, 1859–1937)
 Édouard Frédéric Wilhelm Richter (French, 1844–1913)
 Albert Gabriel Rigolot (French, 1862–1932)
 Antonio Rivas (Italian/Spanish, 1845–1911) 
 David Roberts (Scottish, 1796–1864)
 Agustín Robert y Surís (Spanish, 1860–1913)
 Charles Robertson (British, 1844–1891)
 James Robertson (British, 1813–1888)
  (Spanish, fl. 1870s/80s)
  (Spanish, fl. 1850s)
 Marie Lucas Robiquet (French, 1858–1959)
 Ettore Roesler Franz (Italian, 1845–1907)
 Georges Rochegrosse (French, 1859–1938)
 José María Rodríguez-Acosta (Spanish, 1878–1941) 
 Pedro Roig Asuar (Spanish, 1885–1971)
 Andreas Roller (German-Russian, 1805–1891) 
 Julius Rolshoven (American, 1858–1930)
 Rafael Romero Barros (Spanish, 1832–1895)
 Julio Romero de Torres (Spanish, 1874–1930) 
 Eduardo Rosales (Spanish, 1836–1873)  
 Giulio Rosati (Italian, 1858–1917)
 Domenico Rosso (Italian, 1832–1902)
  (French, 1899–1949)
 Franz Alekseevitch Roubaud (Russian, 1856–1928)
 Santiago Rusiñol (Spanish, 1861– 1931) 
 Alexander Nikolaivich Russov (Russian, 1884–1928)
 Alexandre Roubtzoff (Russian, 1884–1949)
 Henri Émilien Rousseau (French, 1875–1933)  
 Ferdinand Roybet (French, 1840–1920)
  (Spanish, 1867–1942) 
 Charles Marion Russell (American, 1864–1928)
 Albert Pinkham Ryder (American, 1847–1917)

S

 Paul Saïn (French, 1853–1908) 
 Emilio Sala (Spanish, 1850–1910) 
  (Spanish, 1871–1946) 
 Emilio Sánchez Perrier (Spanish, 1855–1907)
 Adolf Karol Sandoz (Polish, 1845–1921)
 Francisco Sans Cabot (Spanish, 1828–1881)  
 Ricardo Santa Cruz Garcia-Pablos (Spanish, 1855–1913)
 Rubens Santoro (Italian, 1859–1942)
 Martiros Saryan (Armenian, 1880–1972) 
 William Sartain (American, 1843–1924) 
 Hubert Sattler (Austrian, 1817–1904)
  (French photographer, 1831–1896)   
 Symeon Savvidis (Greek, 1859–1927) 
 Alice Schille (American, 1869–1955)
 Herbert Gustave Schmalz, also known as Herbert Carmichael (British, 1856–1935) 
  (Austrian, 1834–1921)
 Adolf Schreyer (German, 1828–1899)
 Alois Hans Schram (Austrian, 1864–1919)
 Georg Engelhard Schröder (Swedish, 1684–1750)
 Annibale Scognamiglio (Italian, fl. 1860s/70s)
 Pascal Sébah (Syriac-Armenian, 1823–1886) Orientalist photographer
 Jean Pascal Sébah (Syriac, 1872–1947) Orientalist photographer  
 Stephan Sedlacek (Austrian, 1868–1936)
 Adolf Seel (German, 1829–1907)
 Pablo Segarra Chias (Spanish, b. 1945)
 José Segrelles Albert (Spanish, 1885–1969)
 Mamerto Seguí Arechevala (Spanish, 1862–1908)
 Rafael Senet Pérez (Spanish, 1856–1926)
 Zinaida Serebriakova (Russian, 1884–1967)
 Enric Serra Auqué (Spanish, 1859–1918)
  (Spanish, 1849–1880)
 Thomas Frederick Mason Sheard (British, 1866–1921)
  (Russian, b. 1949)
 Eugène Siberdt (Belgian, 1851–1931)
 Nicolas Sicard (French, 1846–1920)
 Paul Signac (French, 1863–1935)
 Giuseppe Signorini (Italian, 1857–1932)
  (Spanish, 1825–1902)
 José Silbert (French, 1862–1936)
 Arsênio da Silva (Brazilian, 1833–1883)
  (Spanish, 1863–1948)
 Enrique Simonet Lombardo (Spanish, 1866–1927)
 Amedeo Simonetti (Italian, 1874–1922)
 Attilio Simonetti (Italian, 1843–1925)
 Ettore Simonetti (Italian, 1857–1909)
 Gustavo Simoni (Italian, 1846–1926)
 Niels Simonsen (Danish, 1807–1885)
 Henry Singleton (British, 1766–1839)
 Jean-Paul Sinibaldi (French, 1857–1909)
 Joseph Sintès (Spanish-Algerian, 1829–1913)
 Max Slevogt (German, 1868–1932)
 Ernest Slingeneyer (Belgian, 1820–1894)
 Vasily Smirnov (Russian, 1858–1890) 
 Joseph Lindon Smith (American, 1863–1950)
 Reyyan Somuncuoğlu (Turkish, b. 1959)
 José Gutiérrez Solana (Spanish, 1886–1945)
 Simeon Solomon (British, 1840–1905)
  (Spanish, 1827–1891)
 Joaquín Sorolla y Bastida (Spanish, 1863–1923)
 Carl Spitzweg (German, 1808–1885)
 Bedros Sirabyan (Turkish, 1833–1898)
 Kajetan Stefanowicz (Polish, 1886–1920)
 Charles Auguste Guillaume Steuben (French, 1788–1856) 
 Julius LeBlanc Stewart (American, 1855–1919)
 Vincent Stiepevich (Croatian, 1841–1910) 
 Anton Strassgschwandtner (Austrian, 1826–1881)
 Arthur Streeton (Australian, 1867–1943)
  (Polish, 1890–1959)
 André Suréda (French, 1872–1930) 
 Vardges Sureniants (Armenian, 1860–1921)
 James Augustus Suydam (American, 1819–1865)
 Rudolf Swoboda (Austrian, 1859–1914)
 Barbara Szota-Hartavi (Polish, Turkish, b.1989)
 Pantaleon Szyndler (Polish, 1846–1905)

T

  (French, 1818–1869)
 Lawrence Alma-Tadema (Dutch, 1836–1912)
 Lucio Tafuri (Italian, b. 1941) 
 Josep Maria Tamburini (Spanish, 1856–1932) 
  (French, 1879–1970)
  (Algerian, 1877–1954)
 Henry Ossawa Tanner (American, 1859–1937)
 Henri Adrien Tanoux (French, 1865–1923)
 Edmond Tapissier (French, 1861–1943)
 Enrico Tarenghi (Italian, 1848–1938)
  (French, 1863–1932) painter and photographer 
 Paul Tavernier (French, 1852–1943)
 Douglas Arthur Teed (American, 1860–1929)
 Franciszek Tepa (Polish, 1829–1889)
 Henry Jones Thaddeus (Irish, 1859–1929)
 Charles James Theriat (American, 1860–1937)
 Felix Thomas (French, 1815–1875) architect, painter and engraver
 John Rollin Tilton (Italian-American, 1828–1888)
 Alfred Wordsworth Thompson (American, 1840–1896)
  (French, 1897–1976)
 Louis Comfort Tiffany (American, 1848–1933)
 James Tissot (French, 1836–1902)
 Jean-Baptiste-Ange Tissier (French, 1814–1876)
 Charles Toché (French, 1851–1916)
 Edoardo Tofano (Italian, 1838–1920)
 Gyula Tornai (Hungarian, 1861–1928)
 Francesc Torrescassana (Spanish, 1845–1918) 
 Odoardo Toscani (Italian, 1859–1914)
 Charles-Émile de Tournemine (French, 1812–1872) 
  (French, 1876–1953)   
 Pierre Trémaux (French, 1818–1895) photographer, illustrator, architect
 Emanuele Trionfi (Italian, 1832–1900)
 Wincenty Trojanowski (Polish, 1859–1928)
 Paul Désiré Trouillebert (French, 1829–1900) 
 Edward Troye (Swiss-American, 1808–1874)
 Periklis Tsirigotis (Greek, 1860–1924)
 Ramón Tusquets y Maignon (Spanish-Italian, 1837–1904) 
 Walter Frederick Roofe Tyndale (British, 1855–1943)

U

 Marcelino de Unceta y López (Spanish, 1835–1905)  
 Manuel Ussel de Guimbarda y Malibrán (Spanish, 1833–1907) 
 Stefano Ussi (Italian, 1832–1901)

V

 Pierre Henri Vaillant (French, 1878–1939)
  (French, 1909–1971)
 Alberto Valenzuela Llanos (Chilean, 1869–1925) 
 Alfredo Valenzuela Puelma (Chilean, 1856–1909) 
 Salvatore Valeri (Italian, 1856–1946)
 Francisco de Paula Van Halen (Spanish, 1814–1887)
 José María Velasco Gómez (Mexican, 1840–1912) 
  (French, 1808–1867)
 Augusto Valli (Italian, 1867–1945)
 Jules Pierre van Biesbroeck (Belgian, 1873–1965)
 Jean-Baptiste van Mour (Flemish–French, 1671–1731)
 Charles-André van Loo (French, 1705–1765)
 Theodore van Ryselberge (Belgian, 1862–1926)
 Anna Maria van Schurman (Dutch, 1607–1678)
 Alexander Varnek (Russian, 1782–1843)
 Elihu Vedder (American, 1836–1923) 
  (Spanish, c.1845–1910)
 Auguste Veillon (Swiss, 1834–1890)
 Armand Vergeaud (French, 1876–1949)
 Vasily Vereshchagin (Russian, 1842–1904)
 Horace Vernet  (French, 1789–1863) 
 Émile Vernet-Lecomte  (French, 1821–1900) 
 Alexandre René Veron (French, 1826–1897)
 Paolo Veronese (Italian, 1528–1588)
 Jules Jacques Veyrassat (French, 1828 –1893)  
  (French, 1893–1976)
  (Spanish, 1850–1933) 
  (French, 1878–1938)
 Jenaro Pérez Villaamil (Spanish, 1807–1854)
 Ricardo Villodas y de la Torre (Spanish, 1846–1904) 
 Franz Vinck  (Belgian, 1827–1903) 
 Salvador Viniegra y Lasso de la Vega (Spanish, 1862–1915) 
 Frédéric Villot (Belgian, 1809–1875) engraver and conservator  
 Alexander Nikolaevich Volkov (Russian, 1886–1957)  
 Arthur von Ferraris (Hungarian, 1856–after 1928)
 Themistokles von Eckenbrecher  (German, 1842–1921)
 Rudolf Otto von Ottenfeld  (Austrian, 1856–1913) 
 Gaston Vuillier (French, 1845–1915)

W

  (French, 1802–1869)
 Ferdinand Georg Waldmüller (Austrian, 1793–1865) 
 Frank Waller (American, 1842–1923)
  (French, 1881–1970)
 Georges Washington (French, 1827–1910) 
 John William Waterhouse  (British, 1849–1917) 
 Marcus Waterman (American, 1834–1914)
 Edwin Lord Weeks (American, 1849–1903)
 John Reinhard Weguelin (British, 1849–1927)
 Rudolf Weisse (Czechoslovakian, 1859–1930)
 Carl Werner (German, 1808–1894)
 Edwin White (American, 1817–1877) 
 Charles Wilda (Austrian, 1854–1907) 
 Sir David Wilkie (British, 1785–1841)
 James Tibbits Willmore (British, 1800–1863)
 William Clarke Wontner (British, 1857–1930)
 Feliks Michał Wygrzywalski (Polish, 1875–1944)

Y

 Alexander Yakovlev (Russian, 1887–1938)
 Dmitri Ivanovich Yermakov (Russian, 1846–1916) photographer 
 George Henry Yewell (American, 1830–1923)

Z

 Emmanuel Zamor (Brazilian, 1840–1917)
 Adelphoi Zangaki (Brothers Zangaki) (Greek, fl.1860–1890) photographers active in Egypt. 
 Fausto Zonaro (Italian, 1854–1929)
 Félix Ziem (French, 1821–1911)
 Marguerite Thompson Zorach (American, 1887–1968) 
 Anders Leonard Zorn (Swedish, 1860–1920)

See also
 Léonce Bénédite – early patron of Orientalist art and founder of the Société des Peintres Orientalistes Français
 List of artistic works with Orientalist influences
 Orientalism
 Orientalism in early modern France
 Oriental studies
 Société des Peintres Orientalistes Français (Society for French Orientalist Painters)

References

Further reading

 R. Aldrich, Vestiges of Colonial Empire in France, Springer, 2004,  especially pp 206–217
 Roger Benjamin, Orientalist Aesthetics: Art, Colonialism, and French North Africa: 1880–1930, University of California Press, 2003
 Bloom, J.M. and Blair, S. (eds), Grove Encyclopedia of Islamic Art & Architecture, Volumes 1–3, Oxford University Press, 2009
 Haideh Moghissi (ed.), Women and Islam: Images and Realities, Volume 1, Taylor and Francis, 2005

 
Orientalist